Draffan is a farm located 4 miles (6 km) southeast of Larkhall and a mile (1.5 km) west of the M74 motorway, in South Lanarkshire, Scotland.

References

External links

Farms in Scotland
South Lanarkshire